Administration Complex station is a station of the Incheon Airport Maglev in Unseo-dong, Jung District, Incheon, South Korea.

Metro stations in Incheon
Jung District, Incheon
Railway stations opened in 2016
2016 establishments in South Korea
Incheon Airport Maglev